Bilal Gülden (born 1 May 1993) is a Turkish footballer who plays as a midfielder for Kırşehir Belediyespor.

He made his Süper Lig debut for Ankaragücü on 21 May 2011.

References

External links
 
 
 

1993 births
Living people
Footballers from Mannheim
Turkish footballers
Turkey youth international footballers
MKE Ankaragücü footballers
Kayserispor footballers
Adana Demirspor footballers
Boluspor footballers
Eyüpspor footballers
Samsunspor footballers
Tokatspor footballers
Süper Lig players
TFF First League players
TFF Second League players
Association football midfielders